is a passenger railway station located in Tarumi-ku, Kobe, Hyōgo Prefecture, Japan, operated by the West Japan Railway Company (JR West).

Lines

Station layout
The station consists of two opposed elevated side platforms with the station building underneath. The station has a Midori no Madoguchi staffed ticket office.

Platforms

Adjacent stations

|-
!colspan=5|JR West

History
Tarumi Station opened on 1 July 1888. With the privatization of the Japan National Railways (JNR) on  1 April 1987, the station came under the aegis of the West Japan Railway Company.

Station numbering was introduced in March 2018 with Tarumi being assigned station number JR-A70.

Passenger statistics
In fiscal 2019, the station was used by an average of 31,948 passengers daily

Surrounding area
Sanyo Tarumi Station (Sanyo Electric Railway Main Line)
Tarumi Ward office
Taurmi Library
Tarumi Fishing Port

See also
List of railway stations in Japan

References

External links

 JR West Station Official Site

Sanyō Main Line
Railway stations in Kobe
Railway stations in Japan opened in 1888